Hallingskeid Station is a train station on the Bergen Line in the municipality of Ulvik in Vestland county, Norway. It opened along with the central section of the line on 10 June 1908 and remained as a staffed station until 1982. It is located on the Hardangervidda plateau in an area without population or road access. The station therefore serves trekkers and mountaineers. Only some of the Vy Tog trains stop at the station.

The original station building was designed by Paul Due, who used the same architectural plan for four other mountain stations on the line. The snow tunnel has caught fire five times. The fires in 1948, 1953 and 2008 only caused minor damage to the tunnel itself. The 1960 fire burned-down the tunnel, the station building and most of the station area. The last fire, in 2011, had a Class 73 train caught in the tunnel; both it and the tunnel were damaged beyond repair.

History

The station was opened on 10 June 1908, along with the rest of the central portion of the Bergen Line. The station building was of the Mountain Station Variant 1 type, designed by Paul Due. This made it identical to Mjølfjell Station, and with only slight variations to Haugastøl Station, Finse Station and Myrdal Station. During construction, NSB built several buildings for their staff. Two of the houses and an assembly building have been preserved. They were built in 1900 and represent an example of buildings from the construction time. One is partially built in stone, partially in wood, while the other two are entirely in wood. All are now used as cabins. The sick ward for the navvies was bought by Kari Maristuen in 1909 converted to a hotel, named Fjellstova.

Because of the harsh winter conditions, the station area was gradually built with snow tunnels to keep the snow off the tracks. This included the platforms and most of the passing loop at the station. In 1914–15, the station serviced 398 passengers, and in 1919–20, it serviced 684 passengers, both times making it the least used station on the line. In 1948, the western part of the snow tunnel caught fire, and although it spread to the station building, it was quickly put out by the staff. In 1953, there was again a fire in the tunnel.

1960 fire

In 1960, there was a major fire which burned down most of the station area. The tunnel quickly caught on fire, which spread towards the other buildings. The fire was discovered by Station Master Mons Almenningen, who immediately notified Bergen Station, Myrdal Station, and Finse Station. The morning expresses in both directions were en route to Hallingskeid, with the east-bound train about half an hour away. It was forced to turn around at Myrdal, and the passengers were bused from Voss Station across the mountain. The incident occurred around noon. By 12:30 the next day, when the morning express passed the station,  of track had been replaced. Work had been done by 100 men in two shifts around the clock. Four families with a total of fourteen people lost their houses in the fire. The fire caused the hotel to burn down, and it was never rebuilt. A new station building opened in 1970 was built on the same foundation as the old.

The section past the station took electric traction into use on 7 December 1964. The station received automatic train control from 23 September 1982, and starting on 1 October 1982, the station became unmanned. Traffic was stopped and a combination of a fire train and helicopter put out the fire. However, the track and overhead lines past the station were destroyed. The line re-opened on 4 October.

2011 fire
A fire started in the snow tunnel at Hallingskeid on 16 June 2011. It was caused by sparks from welding, which had been completed at 07:45. A freight train passed through the station at 09:16 and the welders left the station at 09:30. The passenger trains which caught on fire, pass through the station at 10:06. As the station is unmanned, there was no prior warning of the fire until the driver saw it from the cab just as the train entered the tunnel. At nearly the same instance, he reached the point of the line where the fire had caused the power to cut. He immediately applied the emergency brake, which allowed the train to stop  from the fire. Because the train had no power, it was not possible to reverse out. The 257 passengers were then immediately evacuated, which took 15 to 20 minutes, and included two people in a wheelchair. Passengers were told to not bring any possessions with them, and many passengers lost valuables, such as laptop computers. All personnel acted according to regulations and no-one was injured in the accident. According to the motorman, had he not lost the power, he would have continued through the tunnel, as the fire was just beginning.

The Norwegian Civil Defence, who did the main bulk of the rescue work, stated that they had been planning on an exercise which would have been identical to the accident, with a train stuck in exactly the same tunnel while it was on fire. The rescue work was difficult, as there is no road connection to the area and all materials have to be transported to the area by air. In addition, the mobile telephone and radio network was out. Representatives stated that it would have been easier if they could have used the GSM-R network operated by the railway, which was functioning. The train, which consisted of a twin Class 73 electric multiple unit, burnt up and was destroyed in the fire. These cost  (€12.7M as of June 2011) each. The fire forced the temporary closure of the Bergen Line, which was reopened in the evening on 23 June.

According to the Accident Investigation Board Norway, the rescue work was hampered by, among other things: lack of fire crew at Voss to drive the fire engine, a defective helicopter bucket, and a three-hour delay from the fire to a rail carriage with water was sent from Ål. Also, the fire carriage from Voss arrived six hours after the accident was reported. Concerns were raised regarding the fire hazards of wooden snow tunnels, and the National Rail Administration admitted that they should be made of a more fire-proof material, such as concrete or steel. Following the accident, the National Rail Administration decided that all welding would have to be monitored for several hours after completion of the work.

Facilities and service
The station is not staffed and serves no local population. The area around the station has no road access, and the station serves only for trekking in the Hardangervidda plateau. There is a self-serve cabin run by the Norwegian Trekking Association nearby. The station building itself is owned by Bane NOR Eiendom, a subsidiary of Bane NOR. The station has a waiting room and washrooms. Up to three daily services in each direction of the Oslo–Bergen service, operated by the state railways, call at Hallingskeid, with up to two bypassing the station each day.

References

Bibliography

Notes

Railway stations in Ulvik
Railway stations on Bergensbanen
Railway stations opened in 1908
1908 establishments in Norway